The second season of Knight Rider, an American television series, began October 2, 1983, and ended on May 27, 1984. It aired on NBC. The region 1 DVD was released on April 12, 2005.

Season two saw the departure of Patricia McPherson as Bonnie Barstow, who was replaced by Rebecca Holden as April Curtis, who became the new technician for KITT. April was written out after Holden left the show at the end of season two, and McPherson returned for season three until the show ended.

Cast
 David Hasselhoff as Michael Knight and Garthe Knight
 William Daniels as the voice of KITT (Knight Industries Two Thousand) (uncredited)
 Edward Mulhare as Devon Miles
 Rebecca Holden as April Curtis
 Richard Basehart as voice of Wilton Knight

Episodes

References

External links 
 
 

 
1983 American television seasons
1984 American television seasons
Knight Rider (1982 TV series) seasons